Megaton  is a UK video games magazine published every four weeks by Sky Jack publishing.

Overview
Megaton was launched in 2009. The magazine is part of Sky Jack Publishing. It is aimed at children.

Below is a list of content in a normal issue of Megaton.

Game Reviews
Features
Comic Strip(s)
Puzzles
Challenges and hi-scores
Website news
Game Gallery (Letters, drawings Etc.)
Competitions

Comic strips are a regular feature in Megaton. It always features comic strips of Cartoon Network cartoons such as The Secret Saturdays, Kids Next Door and Samurai Jack.

References

External links

 Official website

2009 establishments in the United Kingdom
2009 comics debuts
Children's magazines published in the United Kingdom
Comics magazines published in the United Kingdom
Monthly magazines published in the United Kingdom
Video game magazines published in the United Kingdom
Magazines established in 2009